Hypericum perforatum, known as St. John's wort, is a flowering plant in the family Hypericaceae and the type species of the genus Hypericum.

Possibly a hybrid between H. maculatum and H. attenuatum, the species can be found across temperate areas of Eurasia and has been introduced as an invasive weed to much of North and South America, as well as South Africa and Australia. While the species is harmful to livestock and can interfere with prescription drugs, it has been used in folk medicine over centuries, and remains commercially cultivated in the 21st century. Hyperforin, a phytochemical constituent of the species, is under basic research for possible therapeutic properties.

Description 

Hypericum perforatum is an herbaceous perennial plant with extensive, creeping rhizomes. The stems are woody near their base and may appear jointed from leaf scars. The branches are typically clustered about a depressed base. Leaves borne on the branches subtend the shortened branchlets. The leaves are yellow-green in color, with scattered translucent dots of glandular tissue. The dots are conspicuous when held up to the light, giving the leaves a perforated appearance. The flowers appear in broad helicoid cymes at the ends of the upper branches, between late spring and early to mid-summer. The cymes are leafy and bear many flowers. The pointed sepals have black glandular dots. The many stamens are united at the base into three bundles. The pollen grains are ellipsoidal. The black and lustrous seeds are rough, netted with coarse grooves.

When flower buds (not the flowers themselves) or seed pods are crushed, a reddish or purple liquid is produced.

Chemistry 

The plant contains the following:
 Flavonoids (e.g. epigallocatechin, rutin, hyperoside, isoquercetin, quercitrin, quercetin, amentoflavone, biapigenin, astilbin, myricetin, miquelianin, kaempferol, luteolin)
 Phenolic acids (e.g. chlorogenic acid, caffeic acid, p-coumaric acid, ferulic acid, p-hydroxybenzoic acid, vanillic acid)
 Naphthodianthrones (e.g. hypericin, pseudohypericin, protohypericin, protopseudohypericin)
 Phloroglucinols (e.g. hyperforin, adhyperforin)
 Tannins (unspecified, proanthocyanidins reported)
 Volatile oils (e.g. 2-methyloctane, nonane, 2-methyldecane, undecane, α-pinene, β-pinene, α-terpineol, geraniol, myrcene, limonene, caryophyllene, humulene)
 Saturated fatty acids (e.g. isovaleric acid (3-methylbutanoic acid), myristic acid, palmitic acid, stearic acid)
 Alkanols (e.g. 1-tetracosanol, 1-hexacosanol)
 Vitamins & their analogues (e.g. carotenoids, choline, nicotinamide, nicotinic acid)
 Miscellaneous others (e.g. pectin, β-sitosterol, hexadecane, triacontane, kielcorin, norathyriol)

The naphthodianthrones hypericin and pseudohypericin along with the phloroglucinol derivative hyperforin are thought to be among the numerous active constituents. It also contains essential oils composed mainly of sesquiterpenes.

Detection in bodily fluids 
Hypericin, pseudohypericin, and hyperforin may be quantitated in plasma as confirmation of usage and to estimate the dosage. These three active substituents have plasma elimination half-lives within a range of 15–60 hours in humans. None of the three has been detected in urine specimens.

Taxonomy

Phylogeny 

It is probable that H. perforatum originated as a hybrid between two closely related species with subsequent doubling of chromosomes. One species is certainly a diploid a subspecies of H. maculatum, either subspecies maculatum or immaculatum. Subspecies maculatum is similar in distribution and hybridizes easily with H. perforatum, but subspecies immaculatum is more similar morphologically. The other parent is most likely H. attenuatum as it possesses the features of H. perforatum that H. maculatum lacks. Though H. maculatum is mostly western in its distribution across Eurasia and Hypericum attenuatum is mostly eastern, both species share distribution in Siberia, where hybridization likely took place. However, the subspecies immaculatum now only occurs in south-east Europe.

Etymology 

The specific epithet perforatum is Latin, referring to the perforated appearance of the plant's leaves.

The common name "St John's wort" may refer to any species of the genus Hypericum. Therefore, Hypericum perforatum is sometimes called "common St John's wort" or "perforate St John's wort" to differentiate it.

St John's wort is named as such because it commonly flowers, blossoms and is harvested at the time of the summer solstice in late June, around St John's Feast Day on 24 June. The herb would be hung on house and stall doors on St John's Feast day to ward off evil spirits and to safeguard against harm and sickness to people and live-stock.
Alternatively, there may be a connection with the Knights Hospitaller.
The genus name Hypericum is possibly derived from the Greek words hyper (above) and eikon (picture), in reference to the tradition of hanging plants over religious icons in the home during St John's Day.

Distribution and habitat 
H. perforatum is native to temperate parts of Europe and Asia, but has spread to temperate regions worldwide as a cosmopolitan invasive weed. It was introduced to North America from Europe. The species thrives in areas with either a winter- or summer-dominant rainfall pattern; however, distribution is restricted by temperatures too low for seed germination or seedling survival.

The flower occurs in prairies, pastures, and disturbed fields. It prefers sandy soils.

Ecology 
St John's wort reproduces both vegetatively and sexually. Depending on environmental and climatic conditions, and rosette age, St John's wort will alter growth form and habit to promote survival. Summer rains are particularly effective in allowing the plant to grow vegetatively, following defoliation by insects or grazing. The seeds can persist for decades in the soil seed bank, germinating following disturbance.

Diseases 
H. perforatum is affected by phytoplasma diseases, and when infected with Candidatus phytoplasma fraxini it undergoes several phytochemical changes and shows visible symptoms, including yellowing and witches' bloom symptoms. Naphthodianthrone, flavonoid, amentoflavone, and pseudohypericin levels are reduced; chlorogenic acid levels increased. Additionally, phytoplasma diseases greatly reduced the essential oil yield of the plant.

Invasiveness 
Although H. perforatum is grown commercially in some regions of southeast Europe, it is listed as a noxious weed in more than twenty countries and has introduced populations in South and North America, India, New Zealand, Australia, and South Africa. In pastures, St John's wort acts as both a toxic and invasive weed. It replaces native plant communities and forage vegetation to the extent of making productive land nonviable or becoming an invasive species in natural habitats and ecosystems. Ingestion by livestock such as horses, sheep, and cattle can cause photosensitization, central nervous system depression, spontaneous abortion, or death. Effective herbicides for control of Hypericum perforatum include 2,4-D, picloram, and glyphosate. In western North America the beetles Chrysolina quadrigemina, C. hyperici, and Agrilus hyperici have been introduced as biocontrol agents.

Toxicity 
In large doses, St John's wort is poisonous to grazing livestock. Behavioral signs of poisoning are general restlessness and skin irritation. Restlessness is often indicated by pawing of the ground, headshaking, head rubbing, and occasional hindlimb weakness with knuckling over, panting, confusion, and depression. Mania and hyperactivity may also result, including running in circles until exhausted. Observations of thick wort infestations by Australian grazers include the appearance of circular patches giving hillsides a "crop circle" appearance, it is presumed, from this phenomenon. Animals typically seek shade and have reduced appetites. Hypersensitivity to water has been noted, and convulsions may occur following a knock to the head. Although general aversion to water is noted, some may seek water for relief.

Severe skin irritation is physically apparent, with reddening of non-pigmented and unprotected areas. This subsequently leads to itch and rubbing, followed by further inflammation, exudation, and scab formation. Lesions and inflammation that occur are said to resemble the conditions seen in foot and mouth disease. Sheep have been observed to have face swelling, dermatitis, and wool falling off due to rubbing. Lactating animals may cease or have reduced milk production; pregnant animals may abort. Lesions on udders are often apparent. Horses may show signs of anorexia, depression (with a comatose state), dilated pupils, and injected conjunctiva.

Diagnosis 
Increased respiration and heart rate is typically observed while one of the early signs of St John's wort poisoning is an abnormal increase in body temperature. Affected animals will lose weight, or fail to gain weight; young animals are more affected than old animals. In severe cases death may occur, as a direct result of starvation, or because of secondary disease or septicaemia of lesions. Some affected animals may accidentally drown. Poor performance of suckling lambs (pigmented and non-pigmented) has been noted, suggesting a reduction in milk production, or the transmission of a toxin in the milk. It may result in an undesirable flavor.

Potential for adverse effects 
St John's wort may cause allergic reactions and can interact with some prescription drugs. St John's wort is generally well-tolerated, but it may cause gastrointestinal discomfort (such as nausea, abdominal pain, loss of appetite, and diarrhoea), dizziness, confusion, fatigue, sedation, dry mouth, restlessness, headache and hypertension.

The organ systems associated with adverse drug reactions to St John's wort and fluoxetine have a similar incidence profile; most of these reactions involve the central nervous system. St John's wort also decreases levels of estrogens, such as estradiol, by accelerating its metabolism, and women on contraceptive pills are not advised to take it. St. John's wort should not be taken by women during pregnancy or breast-feeding.

Uses

Traditional medicine 
Common St John's wort has been used in herbalism for centuries. It was thought to have medical properties in classical antiquity and was a standard component of theriacs, from the Mithridate of Aulus Cornelius Celsus' De Medicina ( CE) to the Venice treacle of d'Amsterdammer Apotheek in 1686. Folk usages included oily extract (St John's oil) and Hypericum snaps. Hypericum perforatum is a common species and is grown commercially for use in herbalism and traditional medicine.

The red, oily extract of H. perforatum has been used in the treatment of wounds, including by the Knights Hospitaller, the Order of St John. Both hypericin and hyperforin are under study for their potential antibiotic properties.

Medical research

Antidepressant 

A 2015 meta-analysis review concluded that it has superior efficacy to placebo in treating depression, is as effective as standard antidepressant pharmaceuticals for treating depression, and has fewer adverse effects than other antidepressants. The authors concluded that it is difficult to assign a place for St. John's wort in the treatment of depression owing to limitations in the available evidence base, including large variations in efficacy seen in trials performed in German-speaking countries relative to other countries. In Germany, St. John's wort may be prescribed for mild to moderate depression, especially in children and adolescents. A 2008 Cochrane review of 29 clinical trials concluded that it was superior to placebo in patients with major depression, as effective as standard antidepressants and had fewer side-effects. A 2016 review noted that use of St. John's wort for mild and moderate depression was better than placebo for improving depression symptoms, and comparable to antidepressant medication. A 2017 meta-analysis found that St. John's wort had comparable efficacy and safety to SSRIs for mild-to-moderate depression and a lower discontinuation rate.

Some studies and research reviews have supported the efficacy of St John's wort as a treatment for depression in humans.    

In the United States, St John's wort is considered a dietary supplement by the FDA, and is not regulated by the same standards as a prescription drug. According to the United States National Center for Complementary and Integrative Health, St. John's wort appears to be more effective than placebo and as effective as standard antidepressant medications for mild and moderate depression, and that it is uncertain whether this is true for severe depression or for longer than 12 weeks. Supplement strength varies by manufacturer and possibly by batch. With antidepressants, one "may have to try a few before finding what works best," notes the United States National Library of Medicine.

In China, St. John's wort combined with Eleutherococcus senticosus is sold as an antidepressant under the name Shugan Jieyu Jiaonang, according to the Pharmacopoeia of the People's Republic of China. The pharmacopoeia states in Chinese that it is used "for mild and moderate unipolar depression".

Phytochemicals and dietary supplement 

St John's wort, similarly to other herbs, contains different phytochemical constituents. Although St. John's wort is sold as a dietary supplement, there are no standardized manufacturing procedures, and some marketed products may be contaminated with metals, fillers or other impurities.

Notes:

Interactions 
Besides its allergenic effects, St John's wort can interfere (in potentially life-endangering ways) with the effects of many prescription drugs, including the anti-psychotics risperidone and 9-hydroxyrisperidone (i.e. paliperidone, Xeplion or Invega), cyclosporine, digoxin, HIV drugs, cancer medications including irinotecan, and warfarin. Combining both St John's wort and antidepressants could lead to increased serotonin levels causing serotonin syndrome. It should not be taken with the heart medication ranolazine. Combining estrogen-containing oral contraceptives with St John's wort can lead to decreased efficacy of the contraceptive and, potentially, unplanned pregnancies. Consumption of St John's wort is discouraged for those with bipolar disorder, schizophrenia or dementia, and for people using dietary supplements, headache medicine, anticoagulants, and birth control pills.

Pharmacodynamics 
St John's wort has been shown to cause multiple drug interactions through induction of the cytochrome P450 enzymes CYP3A4 and CYP1A2. This drug-metabolizing enzyme induction results in the increased metabolism of certain drugs, leading to decreased plasma concentration and potential clinical effect. The principal constituents thought to be responsible are hyperforin and amentoflavone. There is strong evidence that the mechanism of action of these interactions is activation of the pregnane X receptor.

St John's wort has also been shown to cause drug interactions through the induction of the P-glycoprotein efflux transporter. Increased P-glycoprotein expression results in decreased absorption and increased clearance of certain drugs, leading to lower plasma concentrations and impaired clinical efficacy.

See also 
 Dietary supplement
 EU Food supplements directive
 List of plants poisonous to equines
St John's-bread

Notes

References 

perforatum
CYP2D6 inhibitors
CYP3A4 inducers
Flora of Europe
Flora of Lebanon
Garden plants of Europe
Abortifacients
Antidepressants
Medicinal plants
Serotonin–norepinephrine–dopamine reuptake inhibitors
Plants described in 1753
Pregnane X receptor agonists
Herbs
Subshrubs
Taxa named by Carl Linnaeus